Gold Award for Best Actress in a Lead Role  is an award given as part of its annual Gold Awards for TV serials.

The award was first awarded in 2007 under the title Best Actress in a Lead Role. A special award called Best Actor – Critics or Best Actor – Jury is also awarded occasionally since 2008, whose winner was selected by the jury of critics assigned to the function.

The jury award was awarded without prior nominations until 2010. Since then, the jury award is also awarded with prior nominations just like the original award which is now called Best Actress – Popular.

Superlatives

 Divyanka Tripathi with 4 awards has the record of maximum wins, followed by Ankita Lokhande, Deepika Singh and Shraddha Arya with 2 wins each.
 Divyanka Tripathi also holds the maximum record of 6 nominations.
 Divyanka Tripathi holds the record of 3 wins for same role (Yeh Hai Mohobatein) under Best Actress category
 Rashami Desai holds the record of maximum nominations in 3 different categories for same role (Uttaran), that is, for Best Actress (Popular), Best Actress (Critics) and Best Actress in a negative role (Popular), out of which Desai won the latter two.
There have been only four instances of tie between Ankita Lokhande and Mahi Vijj in 2011, Divyanka Tripathi and Mouni Roy in 2016, Sriti Jha and Shraddha Arya in 2018, and Shraddha Arya and Shivangi Joshi in 2019.

Multiple winners 

 4 Wins: Divyanka Tripathi Dahiya
2 Wins: Ankita Lokhande, Deepika Singh, Shraddha Arya

Multiple nominations 
 6 Nominations: Divyanka Tripathi
 5 Nominations: Sriti Jha
 4 Nominations: Deepika Singh
 3 Nominations: Hina Khan, Shweta Tiwari, Ankita Lokhande, Kratika Sengar
 2 Nominations: Pooja Gor, Giaa Manek, Avika Gor, Sakshi Tanwar, Drashti Dhami, Sanaya Irani, Devoleena Bhattacharjee, Dipika Kakar, Mouni Roy, Surbhi Chandna, Shraddha Arya, Shivangi Joshi, Rubina Dilaik

List of winners (Popular)

2000s
2007 Rajshree Thakur - Saat Phere...Saloni Ka Safar as Saloni Singh
Prachi Desai - Kasamh Se as Bani Walia 
Divyanka Tripathi Dahiya - Banoo Main Teri Dulhann as Vidya Pratap Singh
Priyanka Bassi - Left Right Left as Cadet Naina Singh Ahluwalia
Shweta Tiwari - Kasautii Zindagii Kay as Prerna Bajaj
Smriti Zubin Irani - Virrudh as Vasudha
2008 Divyanka Tripathi - Banoo Main Teri Dulhann as Vidya Pratap Singh / Divya
Parul Chauhan - Sapna Babul Ka...Bidaai as Ragini Ranvir Rajvansh
Sara Khan - Sapna Babul Ka...Bidaai as Sadhana Alekh Rajvansh
Additi Gupta - Kis Desh Mein Hai Meraa Dil as Heer Prem Juneja
Avika Gor - Balika Vadhu as Anandi Jagdish Singh
Shubhangi Atre Poorey - Kasturi as Kasturi Sabbarwal
2009 Not Held

2010s

2010 Ratan Rajput - Agle Janam Mohe Bitiya Hi Kijo as Laali
Ragini Khanna - Sasural Genda Phool as Suhana Ishaan Kashyap
Hina Khan - Yeh Rishta Kya Kehlata Hai as Akshara Singhania
Tina Dutta - Uttaran as Ichha
Ankita Lokhande - Pavitra Rishta as Archana M. Deshmukh
Pooja Gor - Mann Kee Awaaz Pratigya as Pratigya
2011 Ankita Lokhande - Pavitra Rishta as Archana Manav Deshmukh (tied with) Mahhi Vij - Laagi Tujhse Lagan as Nakusha
Anupriya Kapoor - Tere Liye as Taani Anurag Ganguly
Pooja Gor - Mann Kee Awaaz Pratigya as Pratigya
Hina Khan - - Yeh Rishta Kya Kehlata Hai as Akshara Singhania
Rashami Desai - Uttaran  as Tapasya Bundela
Giaa Manek - Saath Nibhaana Saathiya as Gopi Ahem Modi
2012 Ankita Lokhande - Pavitra Rishta as Archana Manav Deshmukh
Giaa Manek - Saath Nibhaana Saathiya as Gopi Ahem Modi
Hina Khan - Yeh Rishta Kya Kehlata Hai as Akshara Singhania
Pratyusha Banerjee - Balika Vadhu — Kachchi Umar Ke Pakke Rishte as Anandi Jagdish Singh
Sakshi Tanwar - Bade Achhe Lagte Hain as Priya Ram Kapoor
Shweta Tiwari - Parvarrish – Kuchh Khattee Kuchh Meethi as Sweety Maya Ahluwalia
2013 Deepika Singh - Diya Aur Baati Hum as Sandhya Rathi 
Sanaya Irani - Iss Pyaar Ko Kya Naam Doon? as Khushi Kumari Gupta Singh Raizada
Drashti Dhami - Madhubala – Ek Ishq Ek Junoon as Madhubala Kundra
Sakshi Tanwar - Bade Achhe Lagte Hain as Priya Ram Kapoor
Rachana Parulkar - Ek Mutthi Aasmaan as Kalpana Jadhav
Shweta Tiwari - Parvarrish – Kuchh Khattee Kuchh Meethi as Sweety Maya Ahluwalia
Avika Gor - Sasural Simar Ka as Roli Siddhanth Bharadwaj
Kratika Sengar - Punar Vivaah as Aarti Yash Sindhia
2014 Deepika Singh - Diya Aur Baati Hum as Sandhya Rathi
Sanaya Irani - Rangrasiya as Parvati
Drashti Dhami - Madhubala – Ek Ishq Ek Junoon as Madhubala Kundra
Divyanka Tripathi - Yeh Hai Mohabbatein as Dr. Ishita Raman Bhalla
 Pooja Sharma -  Mahabharat as Draupadi
Paridhi Sharma - Jodha Akbar as Jodha
2015 Divyanka Tripathi - Yeh Hai Mohabbatein as Dr. Ishita Raman Bhalla
Sriti Jha - Kumkum Bhagya as Pragya Arora
Devoleena Bhattacharjee - Saath Nibhaana Saathiya as Gopi Modi
Pallavi Kulkarni - Itna Karo Na Mujhe Pyar as Ragini Nachiket Khanna
Deepika Singh - Diya Aur Baati Hum as Sandhya Rathi
Toral Rasputra - Balika Vadhu as Anandi Shivraj Shekhar
Dipika Kakar - Sasural Simar Ka as Simar Prem Bharadwaj
2016 Divyanka Tripathi - Yeh Hai Mohabbatein as Dr. Ishita Raman Bhalla (tied with) Mouni Roy - Naagin (season 1) as Shivanya Ritik Singh
Sriti Jha - Kumkum Bhagya as Pragya Arora
Kratika Sengar - Kasam - Tere Pyaar Ki as Tanu Rishi Singh Bedi
Devoleena Bhattacharjee - Saath Nibhaana Saathiya as Gopi Modi
Deepika Singh - Diya Aur Baati Hum as Sandhya Rathi
Dipika Kakar - Sasural Simar Ka as Simar Prem Bharadwaj2017 Divyanka Tripathi - Yeh Hai Mohabbatein as Dr. Ishita Raman BhallaSriti Jha - Kumkum Bhagya as Pragya Arora
Kratika Sengar - Kasam - Tere Pyaar Ki as Tanuja Rishi Singh Bedi
Mouni Roy - Naagin (season 2) as Shivangi Rocky Pratap Singh
Devoleena Bhattacharjee - Saath Nibhaana Saathiya as Gopi Modi
Surbhi Chandna - Ishqbaaz as Annika Shivaay Singh Oberoi2018 Sriti Jha - Kumkum Bhagya as Pragya Mehra (tied with) Shraddha Arya - Kundali Bhagya as Dr. Preeta AroraShivangi Joshi - Yeh Rishta Kya Kehlata Hai as Naira Kartik Goenka
Jennifer Winget - Bepanaah as Zoya 
Rubina Dilaik - Shakti - Astitva Ke Ehsaas Ki as Saumya Harman Singh
Surbhi Chandna - Ishqbaaz as Annika Shivaay Singh Oberoi
2019 Shraddha Arya - Kundali Bhagya as Dr. Preeta Arora 
Sriti Jha - Kumkum Bhagya as Pragya Arora
Rhea Sharma - Yeh Rishtey Hain Pyaar Ke as Mishti Abir Rajvansh
Erica Fernandes - Kasautii Zindagii Kay (2018 TV series) as Prerna Sharma
Rubina Dilaik - Shakti - Astitva Ke Ehsaas Ki as Saumya Harman Singh
Surbhi Jyoti - Naagin (season 3) as Bela Mahir Sehgal

References

Gold Awards
Boroplus Gold Award